Terracina, also known as The Huston House, is a historic home located at Coatesville, Chester County, Pennsylvania.  It was built in 1848, and is a -story, stuccoed stone dwelling with a steeply pitched roof in the Gothic Revival style.  It has a two-story, flat-roofed rear wing.  It features a full-width, hipped-roof front porch. The house was built as a wedding present by Rebecca Lukens for her daughter Isabella upon her marriage to Dr. Charles Huston.

It was added to the National Register of Historic Places in 1978. It is also part of the Lukens Historic District which was listed as a National Historic Landmark in 1994.

References

Houses on the National Register of Historic Places in Pennsylvania
Houses completed in 1848
Houses in Chester County, Pennsylvania
National Register of Historic Places in Chester County, Pennsylvania
Historic district contributing properties in Pennsylvania